Silene cognata (syn. Lychnis cognata), the orange campion or orange catchfly, is a species of flowering plant in the family Caryophyllaceae, native to eastern and northern China, the Korean Peninsula, and Primorsky Krai in Russia. In the wild it is found in a wide variety of habitats, from 500 to 2000 m above sea level. It is occasionally available from commercial suppliers, usually under its synonym Lychnis cognata. In Korea its leaves are harvested in the wild and sold in local markets as a food.

References

cognata
Garden plants of Asia
Flora of Southeast China
Flora of North-Central China
Flora of Inner Mongolia
Flora of Manchuria
Flora of Korea
Flora of Primorsky Krai
Plants described in 1996